HMCS Cowichan (hull number MCB 162) was a  that served in the Royal Canadian Navy during the Cold War. Entering service in 1957, the minesweeper was used primarily as a training vessel on the Pacific coast of Canada. Decommissioned in 1997, the ship was sold in 1999 for conversion to a yacht.

Design and description
The Bay class were designed and ordered as replacements for the Second World War-era minesweepers that the Royal Canadian Navy operated at the time.

They had a complement of 38 officers and ratings.

The Bay-class minesweepers were powered by two GM 12-cylinder diesel engines driving two shafts creating . The ships were armed with one 40 mm Bofors gun and were equipped with minesweeping gear.

Operational history
Ordered as a replacement for sister ship,  which had been transferred to the French Navy in 1954, the ship's keel was laid down on 10 July 1956 by Yarrows Ltd. at  Esquimalt, British Columbia. Named for a bay located in British Columbia, Cowichan was launched on 26 February 1957. The ship was commissioned on 12 December 1957.

After commissioning, the minesweeper joined Training Group Pacific on the West Coast of Canada. In 1972, the class was redesignated patrol escorts. In 1986, the ship rammed and sank a fishing boat in heavy fog in Nanaimo Harbour, but the occupants were rescued. The vessel remained a part of the unit until being paid off on 22 August 1997. The ship was sold in May 1999 for conversion to a yacht.

References

Notes

Citations

References
 
 
 
 
 

 

Bay-class minesweepers
Ships built in British Columbia
1957 ships
Cold War minesweepers of Canada
Minesweepers of the Royal Canadian Navy